This is a list of Bollywood films that were released in 2007.

Box office figures
Top 10 highest grossing Bollywood films of 2007.

Released films

See also
 List of Bollywood films of 2006
 List of Bollywood films of 2008
 Lists of Bollywood films

References

External links
 Bollywood films of 2007 at the Internet Movie Database

2007
Lists of 2007 films by country or language
2007 in Indian cinema